Missing Persons Unit is an Australian television documentary series on the Nine Network hosted by actor and personality Steve Bastoni. The show documents people who have gone missing in Australia and the police who investigate their cases. The show was hosted for its first three years by Mike Munro before he moved to the Seven Network.

The program is produced by Sydney production company Freehand, executive producer for series 1-3 was Ivo Burum.

The first series of Missing Persons Unit screened from February 2006 as 30-minute episodes. The second series began airing in a 60-minute format from February 2008 and remained in that format with the third series airing from June 2009. It began airing on UK television in 2007.

Synopsis
Missing Persons Unit is an observational documentary series that explores the world of the New South Wales Police MPU and the families of missing people.

Filmed at police stations, forensics labs, with families and on location with search and rescue, the program follows MPU operatives as they investigate cases and piece together the jigsaw that might lead to closure for a grief-stricken family.

References

External links
Official Missing Persons Unit site
Missing Persons Unit, Southern Star International
"Theatre of Baring it all", Ruth Ritchie, Sydney Morning Herald, 20 May 2006
Missing Persons Unit proves to be FFC’s most popular doco to date, Tim Irons, Inside Film Magazine, 8 February 2006
 Australian Missing Persons Register
Official Freehand Website

2000s Australian documentary television series
Nine Network original programming
2006 Australian television series debuts
2010 Australian television series endings
Documentary television series about policing
Television series by Freehand Productions
2010s Australian documentary television series